Yaw-Yan, also called Sayaw ng Kamatayan (English:Dance of Death), is a Filipino martial art developed by Napoleon A. Fernandez and based on older Filipino martial arts. 
Since its inception in the 1970s, it has dominated the kickboxing scene in the Philippines and has proven very effective against other stand-up fighting arts.

Yaw-Yan closely resembles Muay Thai, but differs in the hip-torquing motion as well as the downward-cutting nature of its kicks, and the emphasis on delivering attacks from long range (while Muay Thai focuses more on clinching).

Yaw-yan practitioners participate in various Filipino mixed-martial arts tournaments such as the Universal Reality Combat Championship and Fearless Fighting.

History 
The originator of Yaw-Yan is Napoleon A. Fernandez or "Master Nap", a native of Quezon province, who originally studied Jujutsu. The word Yaw-Yan was derived from the last two syllables of Sayaw ng Kamatayan meaning "Dance of Death".

Fernandez had a background in various martial arts such as Jeet Kune Do, Karate, Eskrima, Aikido, and Judo.  He is said to have modified all the martial art forms that he studied and fused them to create a martial art form that is deadly to opponents and "advantageous to the build of Filipinos". Yaw Yan was introduced to the public in 1972.
It includes elements of striking, takedowns, grappling, stick and knife fighting, and additional kickboxing material.

It reflected the growing popularity of Kickboxing during the 1970s to 1980s, and from the 1990s to the Mixed martial arts in the Philippines as well as worldwide.

Training 
The forearm strikes, elbows, punches, dominating palms, and hand movements are empty-hand translations of the bladed weapons.
There are 12 "bolo punches" which were patterned from traditional Filipino martial art of eskrima.

References

Philippine martial arts
Hybrid martial arts